Exhibit A is a four-part English-language documentary TV-series that premiered on Netflix on June 28, 2019 created and directed by Kelly Loudenberg. It explores how forensic techniques, tools and evidence such as blood spatter, touch DNA, cadaver dogs and CCTV footage can be misinterpreted and manipulated to have potentially innocent people convicted.

Release
It was released on August 2, 2019 on Netflix streaming.

References

External links
 
 
 

Netflix original documentary television series
English-language Netflix original programming
2019 American television series debuts